Roger Hallam may refer to:

Roger Hallam (Australian politician) (born 1943), Australian politician
Roger Hallam (activist) (born 1966), British environmental activist